Omar Apolonio Velasco (born May 20, 1997), known professionally as Omar Apollo, is an American singer and songwriter.

After signing a record deal with Warner Records, his debut album, Ivory, was released in 2022 to positive reviews for his vocal performance and the incorporation of Contemporary R&B with Pop music, earning him a Grammy Award nomination for Best New Artist at the 65th Annual Grammy Awards. Apollo sings in both English and Spanish.

Early life 
Born to Mexican parents who immigrated to the US from Guadalajara, first-generation Omar Apollo grew up in Hobart, Indiana with his three older siblings. Apollo's parents both worked multiple jobs to support the family. His family is from the Mexican city of Guadalajara, Jalisco. He danced ballet folklorico when he was a child. He was also a part of his Catholic church choir. At his request, Apollo's parents bought him a guitar when he was 12; however, it was an electric guitar without an amp. Apollo traded the guitar at a pawn shop for an acoustic guitar and started learning how to play by watching and mimicking YouTube cover videos. Apollo was also taught by his uncle and practiced playing at church. He would go on to form a short-lived band with a friend at church.

Career

2017–2020: Career beginnings, breakthrough and debut mixtape Apolonio 

Apollo started his career by creating and uploading his songs to the DIY streaming platform SoundCloud. At this time, he worked at Jimmy John's and Guitar Center and lived in an attic. In 2017, using $30 borrowed from a friend, he uploaded his song "Ugotme" to Spotify, where it was soon added to the platform's Fresh Finds and racked up 20,000 streams in a day. A year later, the song would cross more than 15 million streams.

He released his first EP, Stereo in 2018, which was similarly well received. In 2018 and 2019 he went on two tours, the "Want Tour" and the "Voyager Tour". He released his second EP, Friends in April 2019. The EP featured production by rock producer John Shanks, who had previously worked with artists such as Michelle Branch and Melissa Etheridge. Apollo is managed by Shanks' son, Dylan, who he met over Twitter in July 2017 when the latter booked Apollo for a university show at NYU. Apollo signed with Artists Without A Label earlier that year and performed at SXSW as part of a showcase with the group. He went on his first European tour in 2019 as well, and played at Lollapalooza and Tropicália. In late 2019, Apollo released the singles, "Frío" and "Hit Me Up", both collaborations with producer Kenny Beats. In April 2020, Apollo released the single "Imagine U", another collaboration with Kenny Beats.

On August 7, 2020, Apollo released the lead single "Stayback" from his debut mixtape. On September 10, he released the second single "Kamikaze". On September 25, Apollo appeared on alternative R&B Japanese singer Joji’s second album Nectar, on the track “High Hopes". Apollo then released two more singles "Dos Uno Nueve (219)" and “Want U Around" (featuring Ruel) before releasing his first mixtape, Apolonio on October 16, 2020.

2021–present: Debut studio album Ivory 
Apollo was featured on "Te olvidaste" by Spanish artist C. Tangana on his 2021 album El Madrileño. The song received two Latin Grammy Awards nominations for Record of the Year and Best Alternative Song. At the 65th Grammy Awards, Apollo was nominated for Best New Artist, making it his first Grammy nomination.

In 2021, Apollo released the single "Go Away", including a music video and a live performance on The Tonight Show. He followed up with the single "Bad Life", featuring Kali Uchis, marking their second collaboration after "Hey Boy" from Apolonio. In February 2022, Apollo released the single "Invincible" featuring Daniel Caesar and announced the release date for his debut album. The following month he released the singles "Killing Me", which included a live performance on The Tonight Show, and “Tamagotchi", the latter being co-written and produced by The Neptunes. With the release of “Tamagotchi”, Apple Music Up Next selected Omar Apollo as its featured artist for the month of April 2022.

Apollo released his debut studio album Ivory on April 8, 2022, and also embarked on the Desvelado tour to support the album. The album received mostly positive reviews with praises going towards Apollo's musical growth and vocal performance. It entered the Billboard 200 chart, marking his first-ever entry on the chart. The deluxe version of the album, titled Ivory (Marfil), was released on August 12, 2022. In September 2022, the track "Evergreen" went viral on TikTok which helped boost the song to enter the Spotify and Apple Music charts and eventually debut on Billboard Hot 100 at number 62 for the week ending of October 1, 2022, earning Apollo his first-ever entry on the chart. In response to the rising success, the song was chosen as the album's next single and was later sent to contemporary hit radio on October 4, 2022, making it his first-ever radio single.

In addition to his solo tours, Apollo also performed at the Coachella, Something In The Water and All Points East music festivals in 2022.

Artistry and influences 
Apollo's music has primarily been described as R&B, alternative R&B, and pop music. with elements of soul, funk, hip hop, latin music, trap, and bedroom pop.

Growing up, he listened to his parents' favorite musicians such as Pedro Infante, Los Panchos and the Beatles. His own influences include diverse musicians such as Neil Young, Paul Simon, John Mayer, Prince, Bootsy Collins, Rick James, and the Internet. When speaking to Billboard, Apollo listed Minnie Riperton's Perfect Angel, Whitney Houston's self-titled project, Nirvana's Nevermind, Kanye West's My Beautiful Dark Twisted Fantasy and Lauryn Hill's The Miseducation Of Lauryn Hill as inspiration for his musical career.

Personal life
Apollo is openly gay and has denied  queerbaiting allegations, stating, 'It’s not a choice, it’s just what I am. [...] I’m totally aware of the privilege we have now to be ourselves and still have a career [...] people thought I was queerbaiting before. I wasn’t super open about my sexuality, but people were hearing things. [...] It had a lot to do with me growing up in Indiana which is very conservative. I stopped putting pronouns in my music for a couple of years then I just realized, I can’t let other people’s opinions influence and dictate my life. In an interview in 2022, Apollo discussed the labeling of his sexuality, saying "I feel like in the beginning, [...] I was trying to keep the mystique. But I don't even care anymore [...] now I'm just like, I'm very gay."

Discography

Studio albums

Mixtapes

EPs

Reissues

Singles

As lead artist

As featured artist

Other charted songs

Guest appearances

Music videos

Tours
 Headlining
 W.A.N.T. (2018)
 Voyager (2019)
 Speed of Sound (2019)
 Desvelado (2022)
 Prototype (2022)

 Supporting 
 SZA - SOS Tour (2023)

Accolades and achievements

Notes

References

External links 

 
 
 

Living people
Singers from Indiana
Songwriters from Indiana
Spanish-language singers of the United States
People from Hobart, Indiana
American musicians of Mexican descent
Gay singers
American LGBT songwriters
Hispanic and Latino American musicians
1997 births
American LGBT singers
Gay songwriters
American gay musicians
LGBT people in Latin music
LGBT people from Indiana
American gay writers